Ismarus or Ismaros was a city of the Cicones, in ancient Thrace, mentioned by Homer in the Odyssey.

Homeric Ismarus
After their departure from Troy, Odysseus and his companions stop at Ismaros. They sack the town, and attack the Cicones, the inhabitants of the adjacent region. They kill the men and divide the women and treasures among themselves, then begin to feast, despite Odysseus' advice that they leave immediately. The Cicones, who have left in search of help, come back in the morning in great numbers. Odysseus manages to escape, although he loses several men in the process. He embarks with the survivors and continues his journey home to Ithaca.

While at Ismaros, Odysseus spares Maron, the son of Euanthes and the priest of Apollo, and his family. Because of this, Maron gifts him a "goatskin bottle of black wine", some gold, and a mixing bowl. The wine was a strong and divine drink, as for each cup of wine, 20 times as much water was added to it to dilute it. He uses this wine to lull the Cyclops Polyphemus to sleep.

Historic Ismarus

Ismarus was situated on a mountain of the same name, east of lake Ismaris, on the southeast coast of Thrace. The district about Ismarus produced wine which was highly esteemed. Pliny the Elder refers to the town as Ismaron; Virgil refers to it as Ismara.

Although Lake Ismaris is identified with the modern Lake Mitrikon; Ismarus' site is unlocated.

References

Durando, Furio. Greece, a guide to the archaeological sites (2004).

 Populated places in ancient Thrace
 Greek colonies in Thrace
Destroyed cities
Lost ancient cities and towns
Locations in Greek mythology
Geography of the Odyssey
Former populated places in Greece